Hampus Wanne (born 10 December 1993) is a Swedish handballer for FC Barcelona and the Swedish national team.

Club career
Hampus Wanne started his professional career at Elitserien club HK Aranäs. In January 2013, he moved to the second division team Önnereds HK, the club that he started playing handball as a junior. At the end of the season, regarded as one of the greatest talents on the left wing position, Wanne signed a one-year contract with the Handball-Bundesliga team SG Flensburg-Handewitt for 2013/14 season. In his first season with the team, SG Flensburg-Handewitt qualified for the EHF Champions League final four in Cologne. In the semi final game against Barcelona, he scored three goals after coming in as a substitute at 45th minute when Flensburg was down 24–29 and he played a crucial part in Flensburg's impressive 6–0 run in the final seven minutes of the regular time to force the game into an extra-time which also finished with a draw. In the 7-meter shootout, Wanne scored the decisive penalty against Danijel Šarić and sent his team to the Champions League final. Wanne did not take any part in the final match where Flensburg defeated their German rival THW Kiel 30–28 and reached the Champions League trophy for the first time in the club's history. At the end of the season, Wanne extended his contract with Flensburg until the end of 2015/16 season.

In 2015, Wanne became DHB-Pokal champion with his team after he scored once again the winning penalty in the 7-meter shootout against SC Magdeburg.

In summer 2022, Wanne left SG Flensburg-Handewitt for FC Barcelona.

International career
Wanne made his international debut with Sweden men's national handball team against Germany on 18 March 2017. He was a member of the Swedish national team that took silver medal at the 2018 European Handball Championship in Croatia.

Personal life
He is engaged to former handballer Daniela Gustin.

Honours

Club
EHF Champions League
: 2014
IHF Super Globe
: 2022
 Handball-Bundesliga
 : 2018, 2019
 : 2016, 2017, 2020, 2021
 : 2014, 2015
DHB-Pokal
: 2015
 : 2014, 2016, 2017
 DHB-Supercup:
 : 2019
 : 2015, 2018, 2020
 Copa ASOBAL:
 : 2023
 Supercopa Ibérica:
 : 2022

International
EHF European Championship
 : 2022
 : 2018
 IHF World Championship
 : 2021

Individual awards
All-Star Left wing of the World Championship: 2021
Handball-player of the year in Sweden: 2020/21
All-Star Left wing of the EHF Champions League: 2022

References

External links

SG Flensburg-Handewitt profile 

1993 births
Living people
Swedish male handball players
SG Flensburg-Handewitt players
FC Barcelona Handbol players
Handball-Bundesliga players
Expatriate handball players
Swedish expatriate sportspeople in Germany
Swedish expatriate sportspeople in Spain
Handball players from Gothenburg
Handball players at the 2020 Summer Olympics
Olympic handball players of Sweden